Tore Lindzén (27 February 1914 – 23 January 2003) was a Swedish water polo player who competed in the 1936 Summer Olympics.

Lindzén, born in Stockholm, was part of the Swedish team which finished seventh in the Water polo at the 1936 Summer Olympics, playing in three matches. He died in Kista on January 23, 2003.

References

1914 births
2003 deaths
Swedish male water polo players
Olympic water polo players of Sweden
Water polo players at the 1936 Summer Olympics
Sportspeople from Stockholm